"Veronika, der Lenz ist da" ("Veronica, the spring is here") is a popular 1920s song by Walter Jurmann. Covered countless times, probably the best-known version is by the German sextet, the Comedian Harmonists in 1930.

Lyrics 
The refrain goes:

Interpretation 

The growing asparagus can be read as a sexual metaphor.

References 

 Elisabeth Buxbaum: Veronika, der Lenz ist da. Walter Jurmann – Ein Musiker zwischen den Welten und Zeiten. Mit einem Werkverzeichnis von Alexander Sieghardt. Edition Steinbauer, Wien 2006, 

German songs
German-language songs
1930 songs
Songs with music by Walter Jurmann
Comedian Harmonists songs